Mercedes Pérez (born 4 June 1950) is a Cuban volleyball player. She competed at the 1972 Summer Olympics, the 1976 Summer Olympics and the 1980 Summer Olympics.

References

1950 births
Living people
Cuban women's volleyball players
Olympic volleyball players of Cuba
Volleyball players at the 1972 Summer Olympics
Volleyball players at the 1976 Summer Olympics
Volleyball players at the 1980 Summer Olympics
Place of birth missing (living people)